Uhuru Afrika (subtitled/translated as Freedom Africa) is an album by American jazz pianist Randy Weston recorded in 1960 and originally released on the Roulette label. The album features lyrics and liner notes by the poet Langston Hughes and was banned in South Africa in 1964, at the same time as was Lena Horne's Here's Lena Now! (Max Roach's Freedom Now Suite had been the victim of an earlier banning order), with copies of the albums being seized in Johannesburg and Cape Town.

Reception

The contemporaneous DownBeat reviewer, Ira Gitler, commented that the opening movement was too long, that vocalist Peters was poor in the second movement, and that percussion and solos were effective in the third and fourth movements, respectively. AllMusic awarded the album 5 stars, stating: "Uhuru Afrika is one of the finest (and earliest) combinations of African rhythms with advanced jazz and it features Weston utilizing a 24-piece big band".

Track listing 
''All compositions by Randy Weston except as indicated
 "Introduction: Uhuru Kwanza" (Langston Hughes) - 2:35   
 "First Movement: Uhuru Kwanza" - 5:49   
 "Second Movement: African Lady" (Weston, Hughes) - 8:27   
 "Third Movement: Bantu" - 8:07   
 "Fourth Movement: Kucheza Blues" - 8:03

Personnel 
Randy Weston - piano
Clark Terry - trumpet, flugelhorn
Benny Bailey, Richard Williams, Freddie Hubbard - trumpet
Slide Hampton, Jimmy Cleveland, Quentin Jackson - trombone
Julius Watkins - French horn
Gigi Gryce - alto saxophone, flute
Yusef Lateef - tenor saxophone, flute, oboe
Sahib Shihab - alto saxophone, baritone saxophone
Budd Johnson - tenor saxophone, clarinet
Jerome Richardson - baritone saxophone, piccolo
Cecil Payne - baritone saxophone
Les Spann - guitar, flute
Kenny Burrell - guitar
George Duvivier, Ron Carter - bass
Max Roach, Charlie Persip - drums, percussion
Wilbert Hogan - drums
Candido Camero - congas
Babatunde Olatunji - percussion
Armando Peraza - bongos
Martha Flowers, Brock Peters - vocals
Tuntemeke Sanga - narrator
Melba Liston - arranger

References 

Randy Weston albums
1961 albums
Albums produced by Teddy Reig
Roulette Records albums
Albums arranged by Melba Liston